Bargulum was a settlement of the Illyrian tribe of the Parthini in southern Illyria, modern Albania. Its exact location is still unknown, though it has been proposed that it could be linked with present-day Bargullas.

See also 
Parthini
List of settlements in Illyria

References 

Cities in ancient Illyria
Former populated places in the Balkans
Illyrian Albania